Lewis Morgan is a Welsh rugby union player for Scarlets in the United Rugby Championship. Morgan's primary position is hooker.

Professional career
Morgan began his career with the Tenby RFC youth side, and has captained Ysgol Sir Gar. Morgan was named in the Scarlets academy squad for the 2021–22 season. He made his debut for the Scarlets in Round 14 of the 2021–22 United Rugby Championship against .

References

Living people
Scarlets players
Rugby union hookers
Welsh rugby union players
Rugby union players from Carmarthen
2003 births